The 2008–09 Providence Friars men's basketball team represented Providence College in the Big East Conference. The team finished with a 10–8 conference record and a 19–14 record overall.

In March 2008, head coach Tim Welsh was fired by the school after finishing with a losing record for the third time in four seasons. In April, Drake University head coach Keno Davis replaced him; Davis was named the 2008 Associated Press National Coach of the Year in his first and only season as a head coach at Drake. The Friars had previously been turned down by Louisville head coach Rick Pitino, who coached Providence to the 1987 Final Four, George Mason University head coach Jim Larranaga, a Providence alumnus, and University of Massachusetts head coach Travis Ford.

Davis inherited all five starters from Welsh's final season with the Friars. However, prior to the season junior guard Dwain Williams transferred to Oregon State, while reserve forward Charles Burch was the team's lone departing senior.

At home, the Friars twice defeated ranked opponents; on January 28 they defeated #15 Syracuse, and on February 24, the Friars knocked off #1 Pittsburgh, the first time the school had accomplished the feat since 1976. The Friars received votes in the AP Poll after each win, but were not ranked at any point in the season.

Finishing with a 10-8 record in the Big East, the Friars began the 2009 Big East men's basketball tournament as an eighth seed, defeating DePaul in the first round before falling to top-seeded Louisville in the quarterfinals. They missed the NCAA tournament for a fifth straight season and lost in the first round of the NIT to Miami.

Roster

Depth chart

Incoming recruits

Schedule

|-
!colspan=9| Exhibition games

|-
!colspan=9| Non-conference games

|-
!colspan=9| Big East regular season

|-
!colspan=9| Big East tournament

|-
!colspan=9| NIT

Rankings

Awards and honors

References

External links
2008–09 Providence Friars men's basketball media guide

Providence Friars men's basketball seasons
Providence
Providence
Providence
Providence